Utah GLX was a project aimed at creating a fully free and open-source basic hardware-accelerated 3D renderer using the OpenGL rendering API on Linux kernel-based operating systems. Utah GLX predates Direct Rendering Infrastructure, which is what is used as of 2014.

John D. Carmack worked on Utah GLX.

History

References

External links
 Utah-GLX Homepage
 Historical view at OpenGL and Direct3D

Free 3D graphics software
Free software programmed in C
Graphics libraries
Graphics-related software for Linux
Linux APIs